Encephalartos laevifolius is a species of cycad that is found in the KwaZulu-Natal, Mpumalanga and Limpopo provinces of South Africa, and at Piggs Peak in Eswatini. The species is facing extinction in the wild, but is widely cultivated. As of 2012, the Encephalartos laevifolius has been listed as critically endangered by the IUCN.

Description

It is a cycad with an arborescent habit, with an erect stem, up to 3.5 m tall and with a diameter of 25–35 cm, sometimes with secondary stems originating from basal suckers. The leaves, pinnate, are up to 1 m long, supported by a petiole 22–25 cm long, and composed of numerous pairs of lanceolate, coriaceous leaflets, 12–15 cm long, with entire margins and pungent apex. It is a dioecious species, with male specimens that have 1 to 5 cylindrical-fusiform cones, 30–40 cm long and 9–10 cm wide, yellow to brown in color, and female specimens with 1-5 cylindrical cones, 20–30 cm long and 10–15 cm wide, light yellow. The seeds are roughly ovoid, 2.5-3.5 cm long, covered with a yellow-orange flesh.

References

External links
 
 

laevifolius